Police on the Road is a 1991 Hong Kong action police procedural television series produced by TVB and starring Gallen Lo and Wan Yeung-ming. With a total of 13 episodes, the series contains a different story in each of the episodes. Originally aired from 5 October 1991 to 1 February 1992 on TVB Jade, the show had a rerun on the channel, TVB Classic, from 4 to 12 June 2015 as a part of the special, Our... Gallen Lo (我們的...羅嘉良), that ran from 20 March to 12 June.

Plot
Traffic officer Chan Chi-san (Gallen Lo) transfers to Inspector Lee (Liu Kai-chi) unit in order to work with his friend, Four Eyed Snake (Lo Mang). While investigating a speeding case where Chow Ying-kei (Patrick Hon) ran over and killed a civilian, Chi-san meets reporter Cheung Chi-wai (Lau Sau-ping), and the two fall in love. However, Chi-wai's older brother, Cheung Kam-fai (Lee Lung-kei), is a taxi driver with extreme hate for traffic cops and prevents the romance between the two.

Fellow traffic officer Ho Kwok-cheung (Wan Yeung-ming) has a righteous personality to order to infiltrate an illegal street racing group, he betrays his friend, Joe (Jimmy Wong). Kwok-cheung later meets Angel (Anita Lee), who is a mistress of a rich businessman, and instantly falls in love with her. However, Angel gets into a dilemma whether to choose Kwok-cheung or stay with the rich businessman.

Episodes

Cast

Traffic Branch Headquarters
Gallen Lo as Chan Chi-san (陳志新)
Wan Yeung-ming as Ho Kwok-cheung (何國昌)
Sing Yan as Chu Man-fai (朱文輝)
Lo Mang as Four Eyed Snake (眼鏡蛇)
John Wu as Wong Sai-leung (王世良)
Chiu Hung as Officer Choi (蔡Sir)

Other
Lau Sau-ping as Cheung Chi-wai (張紫蕙)
Cheng Ka-sang as Cheung (阿祥)
Tsui Kwong-lam as Uncle Ping (炳叔)
Pok Kwan as Ming (阿明)
Ngai Sin-lap as test examiner

Episode 1
Gabriel Wong as Brother Cho (初哥)
Lee Wai-man as Car owner
Sit Chun as Strange passenger
Lui Chui-ping as Shanghai lady (上海婆)

Episode 2
Tsui Ka-po as Pinky
Mak Chi-suet as Mad Keung (喪強)
Andy Tai as Chan Lung-fu (陳龍虎)
Wai Tak-sing as Bold Chuen (沙胆泉)
Chan Siu-ping as Little Devil (小妖)
Ngan Ching-wai as Gi Gi
Chin Chau as Connie
Fung Shui-chun as Pinky's mother
Chan Yin-hong as Nurse
Chan Chun-lok as Happy
Yau Piu as Car racer
Cheng Chun-fan as punk
Choi Chi-fung as Keung's underling
Yip Chi-wah as Keung's underling

Episode 3
Patrick Hon as Chow Ying-kei (周英奇)
Gilbert Lam as Adviser Kau (師爺九)
Yip Sai-kuen as Rocky
Ceci So as Aunt Ming (明嬸)
Teresa Ha as Aunt Ming's mother
Wong Sau-kuen as Female colleague
Wong Wai-fan as Female secretary
Lui Kim-kwong as News stall owner
Ho Pik-kin as Chief editor

Episode 4
Lee Lung-kei as Cheung Kam-fai (張錦輝)
Wan Seung-yin as Female passenger
Ying Sin-yin as Passerby
Liu Pui-ling as Female driver
Wong Fung-king as Pregnant woman
Cheng Chun-fai as Waiter

Episode 5
Anita Lee as Angel
Wong Chun-kit as Passenger
Shek Yat-ming as Driver A
Guo Cheuk-wah as Rascal A
Wat Wai-lam as Rascal B
Kwok Cho-yin as Driver B
Leung Kin-ping as Ben
Hung Ho-wan as Bodyguard A
Chow Chin-yee as Bodyguard B
Chan Yiu-man as Waiter
Wong Mei-yee as Cori
Tai Siu-man as Boyfriend
Tam Suk-mui as Female staff
So Chi as Guard

Episode 6
Wayne Lai as Man (阿文)
Cho Chai as Old man Lau (劉伯)
Wu Ying-man as Jacky
Tam Yat-ching as Uncle Kwan (坤叔)

Episode 7
Wong Yat-fei as Uncle Kuen (權叔)
Elton Loo as Po (阿寶)
Fung Chi-fung as Thug
Wong Chung-chi as Thug
Suet Tai-wah as Thug
Fong Kit as Police superintendent
Au Yuk as Mini-bus driver

Episode 8
Cheng Lui as Uncle Tat (達叔)
Kwan Chi-piu as Leung (阿良)
Steve Lee as Master Ting (頂爺)
Chan Wing-chun as Wing (阿榮)
Kong Ming-fai as Wing's underling
Lam To-kuen as Keung (阿強)
Lee Wai-man as Man (阿民)
Fong Kit as Chief Inspector

Episode 9
Gary Chan as Luk (阿祿)
Chan Pui-san as May
Lam Kin-fai as Tommy 
Wong Man-piu as Film director
Fung Man-ching as Annie
Cheung Chun-wah as Film star
Chan Yiu-wah as Doctor

Episode 10
Lee Hin-ming as Crippled Chicken (廢雞)
Dick Chan as Dr. Yiu (姚偉生)
Jimmy Wong as Joe
Wu Man-yam as Tina
Ling Hon as Old man Tang (鄧伯)
Cheng Wai-ka as Sandy
Tsang Yiu-ming as Brother Ho (豪哥)
Chan Yin-hong as Nurse
Tam Suk-mui as Nurse

Episode 11
Cheng Siu-ping as Aunt King (琼姑)
May Tse as Chu Man-fai's wife
Shek Wan as Uncle Kuen (權叔)
Yuen Lung-kui as Robber A
Lau Wan as Robber B
Chan Wai-yu as Aunty (阿嬸)
Mak Ka-lun as Policeman A
Wai Tak-sing as Policeman B
Yung Ka-lai as Cashier

Episode 12
Siu Yan-san as Politician
Liu Kai-chi as Inspector Lee (李Sir)
Law Lan as Lee's mother
Cheng Kwan-ning as Snake Ning (蛇仔明)
Candy Man as Grace
Fong Kit as Officer Yip (葉Sir)
Wong Sze-yan as Driver
Wan Lap-chun as Ben
Law Hung as Officer Chiu (趙Sir)

Episode 13
Andrew Yuen as Mick (阿明)
Hau Wai-wan as Carly
Ho Pik-kin as Editor
Tang Yu-chiu as 12th Young Master (十二少)
Wong Wai-fan as Secretary
Ku Sui-kwan as Underling
Cheng Pak-wan as Underling
Cheng Ka-chung as Underling

References

External links
Police on the Road at MyTV

TVB dramas
1991 Hong Kong television series debuts
1992 Hong Kong television series endings
Hong Kong action television series
Hong Kong police procedural television series
1990s Hong Kong television series
Cantonese-language television shows